Guillermo Ariel Pereyra (born 20 February 1980) is an Argentine retired footballer who played as a defensive midfielder.

He spent most of his 13-year professional career with River Plate and Mallorca, winning four major titles with the former and appearing in 129 competitive games with the latter.

Football career
Born in Río Cuarto, Córdoba, Pereyra began his professional career at Club Atlético River Plate, helping the club to four Primera División titles during his spell there. In January 2004 he was transferred to RCD Mallorca in Spain, eventually becoming an undisputed starter for the La Liga side and making his debut in the competition on 8 February by coming on as a 63rd minute substitute in a 0–3 away loss against Sevilla FC.

In March 2008, Pereyra moved to FC Lokomotiv Moscow, but the Russians decided to terminate the deal shortly after, and he subsequently joined BSC Young Boys on 11 February 2009, initially until the end of the season.

Pereyra returned to Spain in late August 2009, penning a two-year deal with Real Murcia from the second division after arriving on a free transfer. For the following campaign, after the team's relegation, he returned to his country and signed with San Lorenzo de Almagro.

Personal life
He is the older brother of the Argentine footballer Federico Pereyra.

Honours

References

External links
 Argentine League statistics at Fútbol XXI  
 
 
 Guillermo Pereyra at Footballdatabase

1980 births
Living people
People from Río Cuarto, Córdoba
Argentine footballers
Association football midfielders
Argentine Primera División players
Club Atlético River Plate footballers
San Lorenzo de Almagro footballers
La Liga players
Segunda División players
RCD Mallorca players
Real Murcia players
Russian Premier League players
FC Lokomotiv Moscow players
Swiss Super League players
BSC Young Boys players
Argentine expatriate footballers
Expatriate footballers in Spain
Expatriate footballers in Russia
Expatriate footballers in Switzerland
Argentine expatriate sportspeople in Spain
Argentine expatriate sportspeople in Russia
Argentine expatriate sportspeople in Switzerland
Sportspeople from Córdoba Province, Argentina